is a former Japanese football player.

Playing career
Suzuki was born in Shizuoka on May 13, 1982. He joined J1 League club Shimizu S-Pulse from youth team in 2001. On May 12, 2002, he debuted as substitute midfielder from the 59th minute against FC Tokyo in J.League Cup. However he could not play many matches until 2004. In 2005, he moved to J2 League club Ventforet Kofu. Although he played as regular player initially, he could hardly play in the match from April. He retired end of 2005 season.

Club statistics

References

External links

1982 births
Living people
Association football people from Shizuoka Prefecture
Japanese footballers
J1 League players
J2 League players
Shimizu S-Pulse players
Ventforet Kofu players
Association football midfielders